The Green Alley (German: Die Rothausgasse) is a 1928 German silent film directed by Richard Oswald and starring Grete Mosheim, Gustav Fröhlich and Marija Leiko. The film was made by the German branch of Universal Pictures and was based on the novel Der heilige Skarabäus by Else Jerusalem. It was shot at the Staaken Studios in Berlin. The art direction was overseen by Gustav A. Knauer and Willy Schiller.

Cast
 Grete Mosheim as Milada Rezek 
 Gustav Fröhlich as Gustav Brenner 
 Marija Leiko as Katherina Rezek 
 Else Heims as Frau Goldschneider 
 Camilla von Hollay as Fritzi, Wirtschafterin 
 Hilde Jennings as Helenka 
 Paul Otto as Dr. Brenner 
 Oskar Homolka as Dr. Horner 
 Betty Astor as Miladas Freundin 
 Lotte Stein   
 Hermann Picha  
 Hans Brausewetter

References

Bibliography
 Weniger, Kay. 'Es wird im Leben dir mehr genommen als gegeben ...' Lexikon der aus Deutschland und Österreich emigrierten Filmschaffenden 1933 bis 1945. ACABUS Verlag, 2011.

External links

1928 films
Films of the Weimar Republic
German silent feature films
Films directed by Richard Oswald
Films based on Austrian novels
Films with screenplays by Franz Schulz
German black-and-white films
Films shot at Staaken Studios